Archidendron lucyi  is a small tree species in the legume family (Fabaceae). The native range extends from North Eastern Australia, Eastern Malesia to the Solomon Islands. A. lucyi grows in the understorey of lowland rainforest.

As with other members of the genus, A. lucyi produces large pinnate leaves. The species is cauliflorous, producing flowers directly from the trunk. The cream coloured filaments are 3–5 cm long and form the showiest part of the flowers. The flowers are followed by highly conspicuous red or orange seed pods, which split open when ripe to reveal black seeds.

References

lucyi
Flora of Queensland
Taxa named by Ferdinand von Mueller